In geometry, a spirangle is a figure related to a spiral.  Spirangles are similar to spirals in that they expand from a center point as they grow larger, but they are made out of straight line segments, instead of curves. Spirangle vectographs are used in vision therapy to promote stereopsis and help resolve problems with hand–eye coordination.

Two-dimensional spirangles
A two-dimensional spirangle is an open figure consisting of a line bent into angles similar to a corresponding polygon.  The spirangle can start at a center point, or a distance from the center, and has some number of turns around the center point.

Three-dimensional spirangles
Three-dimensional spirangles have layers that slant upward, progressively gaining height from the previous segment. This is similar to staircases in large buildings that turn at the top of each flight.  The segments also may progressively lose an amount of length and resemble a pyramid.

Uses
 Ophthalmology — 
 Electronics — printed inductors
 Architecture — ‘spiral’ staircases
 Jewelry — earrings, pendants
 Search algorithms — optimal scanning of a region of interest, for example a crime scene or a region of the celestial sphere

See also
 Turtle graphics

References
 Michael Scheiman & Bruce Wick (2013) Clinical Management of Binocular Vision, pp. 216, 256, 272, Wolters Kluwer, Fourth edition, .
 Jaime Aquilera & Roc Berenquer (2007) Design and Test of Integrated Inductors for RF Applications, p. 24, Springer Science & Business Media .

External links
 Colorado College field archeology site with a sample of ancient spirangle art

Ophthalmology
Spirals
Applied mathematics